"Original" is a song performed by Norwegian pop duo Cir.Cuz featuring vocals from Emila. It was released on 8 December 2014 as a digital download in Norway. The song peaked at number 28 on the Norwegian Singles Chart.

Track listing

Chart performance

Weekly charts

Release history

References

2014 singles
2014 songs